Ben Tari (born 4 July 1972) is an Australian actor most known for his work as Jared Levine on All Saints, an Australian hospital drama.

He is a graduate of the Australian National Institute of Dramatic Arts (NIDA). He joined all Saints from 1998 to 2003, (Season 1–6) and stayed for consecutive 235 episodes and guest starred in 2005 in episode 320, season 8. Ben has also starred in 6 episodes of Home and Away.

Tari was an English and Drama teacher at Dulwich High School of Visual Arts and Design. He also served as the year adviser for six years.

In the winter of 2014 Tari directed a high school production of Back to the 80s. This production was highly acclaimed and well received, and in 2016, directed the production of A Midsummer Night's Dream. His last production at DHSVAD was in 2018; A Rock Apocalypse, which was once again a huge success. He also currently works at Trinity Anglican College in Albury.

He now performs, produces and writes as a freelance creative.

References

Australian male television actors
Living people
1972 births